Wettinia disticha is a species of flowering plant in the family Arecaceae. It is found only in Colombia.

References

disticha
Endemic flora of Colombia
Least concern plants
Least concern biota of South America
Taxonomy articles created by Polbot